Jessica Katherine Lee (born 7 April 1976) is a British former Conservative Party politician. She was elected as the Member of Parliament (MP) for the constituency of Erewash in Derbyshire in 2010. She served as Parliamentary Private Secretary to the Attorney General, Dominic Grieve, before stepping down for the 2015 general election.

Early life
Lee was born in Nottingham on 7 April 1976, educated at Loughborough High School and Royal Holloway, University of London, where she graduated with a degree in History & Politics in 1997 and served as Chair of the college's Conservative Students Society. She was the first person from her family to go to university.

Lee went on to study at the College of Law. She was called to the Bar by the Middle Temple in 2000, and practised as a barrister specialising in family law.

At the 2005 general election, Lee stood as a parliamentary candidate for the Conservative Party in Camberwell and Peckham, finishing third with 9.8% of the vote in a constituency won by the incumbent Labour Party MP Harriet Harman.

Parliamentary career
Lee was elected to the House of Commons as MP for Erewash in the 2010 general election with a majority of 2,501. After her victory was confirmed, she said: "I feel privileged, honoured, slightly overwhelmed. I mean it when I say I will do my best to serve everyone in Erewash, whether they voted for me or not". Lee campaigned enthusiastically for the opening of a railway station in Ilkeston, and raised the issue in the House of Commons.

Following the formation of the Cameron Ministry in May 2010, Lee was appointed as the Parliamentary Private Secretary to the Attorney General, Dominic Grieve.

In January 2014, Lee announced her intention to step down at the 2015 general election.

References

External links
Jessica Lee MP official constituency website

UK MPs 2010–2015
Conservative Party (UK) MPs for English constituencies
Alumni of Royal Holloway, University of London
People educated at Loughborough High School
Politicians from Nottingham
1976 births
Living people
Female members of the Parliament of the United Kingdom for English constituencies
Members of the Parliament of the United Kingdom for constituencies in Derbyshire
21st-century British women politicians
21st-century English women
21st-century English people